Humboldt is a town in Minnehaha County, South Dakota, United States. The population was 579 at the 2020 census.

History
The first settlement at Humboldt was made in 1877. The town was named from its location in Humboldt Township. A post office called Humboldt has been in operation since 1889.

Geography
Humboldt is located at  (43.644933, -97.074320).

Humboldt has been assigned the ZIP code 57035 and the FIPS place code 30900.

Lost Lake lies two miles north of the town, while Beaver Lake lies one mile east of town.

Humboldt is accessible via exit 379, off Interstate 90, marking the halfway point on the longest interstate in the United States

Demographics

2010 census
At the 2010 census there were 589 people, 227 households, and 160 families living in the town. The racial makeup of the town was 95.8% White, 0.2% African American, 1.4% Native American, 1.0% from other races, and 1.7% from two or more races. Hispanic or Latino of any race were 1.5%.

Of the 227 households 39.2% had children under the age of 18 living with them, 55.1% were married couples living together, 9.7% had a female householder with no husband present, 5.7% had a male householder with no wife present, and 29.5% were non-families. 22.9% of households were one person and 8.8% were one person aged 65 or older. The average household size was 2.59 and the average family size was 3.04.

The median age in the town was 33.3 years. 30.2% of residents were under the age of 18; 6.8% were between the ages of 18 and 24; 28.1% were from 25 to 44; 21.1% were from 45 to 64; and 13.9% were 65 or older. The gender makeup of the town was 52.5% male and 47.5% female.

2000 census
At the 2000 census, there were 521 people, 200 households, and 148 families living in the town. The population density was 831.0 people per square mile (319.3/km). There were 210 housing units at an average density of 335.0 per square mile (128.7/km). The racial makeup of the town was 96.74% White, 1.73% Native American, 0.58% Asian, 0.19% from other races, and 0.77% from two or more races. Hispanic or Latino of any race were 0.19% of the population.

Of the 200 households 42.0% had children under the age of 18 living with them, 62.0% were married couples living together, 7.0% had a female householder with no husband present, and 26.0% were non-families. 25.5% of households were one person and 15.0% were one person aged 65 or older. The average household size was 2.61 and the average family size was 3.09.

The age distribution was 31.7% under the age of 18, 6.7% from 18 to 24, 31.1% from 25 to 44, 15.9% from 45 to 64, and 14.6% 65 or older. The median age was 32 years. For every 100 females, there were 98.9 males. For every 100 females age 18 and over, there were 100.0 males.

The median household income was $39,250 and the median family income  was $45,000. Males had a median income of $27,426 versus $22,083 for females. The per capita income for the town was $16,455. About 5.8% of families and 6.1% of the population were below the poverty line, including 8.2% of those under age 18 and 5.1% of those age 65 or over.

Notable people
 Karl Mundt, United States Congressman and Senator, was born in Humboldt and spent part of his childhood there.
 Larry Pressler, United States Congressman and Senator, was born in Humboldt and attended elementary and high school there.

References

External links
 City website

Towns in Minnehaha County, South Dakota
Towns in South Dakota
Sioux Falls, South Dakota metropolitan area
Populated places established in 1877
1877 establishments in Dakota Territory